Ruban may refer to:

Rúbaň, Slovakia
 Ruban Jaune, (English; Yellow Ribbon) a cycling trophy
Viktor Ruban (born 1981), Ukrainian athlete
Ruban Nielson, New Zealand musician
Rubanisation, a concept of human settlements, where city and countryside are considered one space.
A ribbon controller (French)

See also
Ruben (disambiguation)